Upside Foods (formerly known as Memphis Meats) is a food technology company headquartered in Berkeley, California, aiming to grow sustainable cultured meat. The company was founded in 2015 by Uma Valeti (CEO), Nicholas Genovese (CSO), and Will Clem. Valeti was a cardiologist and a professor at the University of Minnesota.

The company plans to produce various meat products using biotechnology to induce stem cells to differentiate into muscle tissue, and to manufacture the meat products in bioreactors.

History
In February 2016, Memphis Meats published a video of a cultured meatball and in March 2017, they published a video of cultured chicken and duck dishes. In February 2017, the company indicated its goal was to produce at 60 euros per kilogram and enter the market by 2020.

In August 2017, Memphis Meats announced that it had raised a $17 million Series A funding round. The round was led by DFJ and also included investment from Bill Gates, Richard Branson, Suzy and Jack Welch, Cargill, Kimbal Musk, and Atomico.

As of June 2017, the company had reduced the cost of production to below $2,400 per pound ($5,280/kg). The company said it anticipated cost reductions and commercial release of its products by 2021.

In January 2020, Memphis Meats raised a $161 million Series B. The round was led by Softbank Group, Norwest, and Temasek. Also joining the round are new and existing investors including Richard Branson, Bill Gates, Threshold Ventures, Cargill, Tyson Foods, Finistere, Future Ventures, Kimbal Musk, Fifty Years, and CPT Capital. Memphis Meats expects to use the funds to build a pilot production facility and to hit a major milestone of launching products into the market within the coming years.

In May 2021, the company announced that it was changing its name to Upside Foods. In September 2021, co-founder and chief science officer Genovese, as well as process development vice president KC Carswell, left the company.

On November 4, 2021, Upside Foods opened its first large-scale production plant, called the "Engineering, Production, and Innovation Center" (EPIC), in Emeryville, California. It covers 16,154 square meters (53,000 square feet), with renewably-powered vats and tubes, in order to produce 22,680 kilograms (50,000 pounds) of cultured meat annually, to be sold commercially.

FDA approval
On November 17, 2022, the FDA completed a pre-market consultation process for the company to sell its cultivated chicken to the public. This makes Upside Foods the first company to complete this pre-market consultation. The FDA made it clear in its announcement, however, that this was not considered an approval process.

References

External links
 

Biotechnology companies of the United States
Cellular agriculture
Food and drink companies of the United States
Food technology organizations
Meat substitutes